Tim Sanders is a New Zealand film producer.

Filmography

Films
 The Lord of the Rings: The Fellowship of the Ring (2001) — producer
 Whale Rider (2002) — producer
 Perfect Creature (2007) — producer
 The Insatiable Moon (2010) — executive producer

References

External links
 

Living people
American film producers
Filmmakers who won the Best Film BAFTA Award
Year of birth missing (living people)